The Uganda National Mosque is a mosque located at Kampala Hill in the Old Kampala area of Kampala, Uganda. It is the largest mosque in East Africa in a country where, as of 2014, 14% of the population is Muslim. Completed in 2006, it seats up to 15,000 worshipers and can hold another 1,100 in the gallery, while the terrace will cater for another 3,500. Colonel Muammar Gaddafi of Libya commissioned the mosque as a gift to Uganda, and for the benefit of the Muslim population. Uganda has many mosques but this one is a skyscraper mosque.

History

The construction of the mosque began in 1972 and was initially called the Old Kampala National Mosque. Construction halted in 1976 and restarted again in 2001.

The completed mosque was opened officially in June 2007 under the name Gaddafi National Mosque, and housed the head offices of the Uganda Muslim Supreme Council. It was renamed "Uganda National Mosque" in 2013 following the death of Colonel Gaddafi as the new Libyan administration was "reluctant to rehabilitate the mosque under the old name."

The mosque's minaret contains 304 stairs to reach the top.

Gallery

See also
 Gaddafi Mosque, Dodoma, Tanzania

References

External links

 
 Gaddafi National Mosque, Uganda Museum.

Mosques in Uganda
Buildings and structures in Kampala
Mosques completed in 2006
2016 establishments in Uganda
Muammar Gaddafi